Live in Berlin is a live album by American jazz pianist Marilyn Crispell. It was recorded in November 1982 during the Total Music Meeting, and was released on the Italian Black Saint label in 1984. On the album, is joined by violinist Billy Bang, bassist Peter Kowald, and drummer John Betsch. The piece "ABC" is dedicated to Anthony Braxton, with whom she worked beginning in 1978.

Reception

In a review for AllMusic, Scott Yanow wrote: "Crispell shows a great deal of passion on three of her originals... Violinist Billy Bang..., bassist Peter Kowald and drummer John Betsch complete the quartet on this intense concert performance."

The authors of the Penguin Guide to Jazz Recordings wrote that Crispell "holds up strongly in some pretty rugged company... Her background in classical, particularly Baroque, music is still clearly audible as she negotiates oblique contrapuntal passages and wild, seamless fugues."

Track listing
All compositions by Marilyn Crispell
 "ABC (for Anthony Braxton)" – 23:21
 "Chant" – 6:53
 "Burundi" – 16:07

Personnel
Marilyn Crispell – piano
Billy Bang – violin
Peter Kowald – bass
John Betsch – drums

References

1984 live albums
Marilyn Crispell live albums
Black Saint/Soul Note live albums